The Ford RS200 is a mid-engined, four-wheel drive sports car that was produced by Ford Motorsport in Boreham, UK, from 1984 to 1986. The road-going RS200 was the basis for Ford's Group B rally car and was designed to comply with FIA homologation regulations, which required 200 parts kits to be produced and at least one road-legal car to be assembled. It was first displayed to the public at the Belfast Motor Show.

History 
Following the introduction of the MKIII Escort in 1980, Ford Motorsport set about developing a rear-wheel-drive, turbocharged variant of the vehicle that could be entered into competition in Group B rally racing, and dubbed the new vehicle the Escort RS 1700T. A problem-filled development led Ford to abandon the project in frustration in 1983, leaving them without a new vehicle to enter into Group B. Not wanting to abandon Group B or simply "write off" the cost of developing the failed 1700T, executives decided to make use of the lessons learned developing that vehicle in preparing a new, purpose-built rally car. In addition, Ford executives became adamant that the new vehicle would feature all-wheel-drive, an addition they felt would be necessary to allow it to compete properly with all-wheel-drive models from Peugeot and Audi.

The new vehicle was a unique design, featuring a plastic-fiberglass composite body designed by Ghia, a mid-mounted engine and four-wheel drive. The cars were built on behalf of Ford by another company well known for its expertise in producing fibreglass bodies - Reliant. To aid weight distribution, designers mounted the transmission at the front of the car, which required that power from the mid-mounted engine go first up to the front wheels and then be run back again to the rear, creating a complex drive train setup. The chassis was designed by former Formula One designer Tony Southgate, and Ford's John Wheeler, a former F1 engineer, aided in early development. A double wishbone suspension setup with twin dampers on all four wheels aided handling and helped give the car what was often regarded as being the best balanced platform of any of the RS200's contemporary competitors. The Ford parts-bin was raided to help give the RS200 a Ford corporate look; for example, the front windscreen and rear lights were identical to those of the early Sierra and the doors were cut-down Sierra items. Small parts-bin items like switchgear were also used to save development time and expenses.

Although the RS had the balance and poise necessary to be competitive, its power-to-weight ratio was poor by comparison, and its engine produced notorious low-RPM lag, making it difficult to drive and ultimately less competitive. Factory driver Kalle Grundel's third-place finish at the 1986 WRC Rally of Sweden represented the vehicle's best-ever finish in Group B rallying competition, although the model did see limited success outside of the ultra-competitive Group B class. However, only one event later, at the Rally de Portugal, a Ford RS200 was involved in one of the most dramatic accidents in WRC history, claiming the lives of three spectators and injuring many others. Another Ford RS200 was crashed by Swiss Formula One driver Marc Surer against a tree during the 1986 Hessen-Rallye in Germany, killing his co-driver and friend Michel Wyder instantly.

The accident at Rally Portugal set off a chain reaction and the RS200 became obsolete after only one full year of competition as the FIA, the governing board, which at the time controlled WRC rally racing, abolished Group B after the 1986 season. For 1987, Ford had planned to introduce an "Evolution" variant of the RS200, featuring a development of the BDT engine, called later as BDT-E, displacing , developed by Briton Brian Hart.

One RS200, which found its way into circuit racing, originated as a road car; it was converted to IMSA GTO specification powered by an over-750 BHP 2.0 litre turbo BDTE Cosworth Evolution engine. Competing against the numerous factory-backed teams such as Mazda, Mercury and Nissan, with their newly built spaceframe specials, despite being a privateer, the car never achieved any real success to be a serious contender and was kept by the original owner. A parts car was built in England and later used to compete in the unlimited category at the Pikes Peak International Hill Climb, where it was driven by Swede Stig Blomqvist in 2001, 2002 and 2004 and in 2009 by former British Rallycross champion Mark Rennison.

The RS200 was designed from the ground-up as a purpose-built, mid-engined rally-supercar, and the 200 homologation road-legal models were essentially a by-product of Ford wanting to race the RS200 and show off their technology capabilities in the increasingly popular World Rally Championship. It was also designed by engineers who had extensive backgrounds in motorsports, and the engine had a smooth power delivery and functioned more like a racing car engine, as opposed to every one of the other highly modified production-based engines that Audi, Lancia and Peugeot had in their cars. The other famous Group B cars were all based on front-engined production models- and in both the Lancia Delta S4 and the Peugeot 205 T16's case - hatchbacks, and in the Audi Quattro's case - a luxury coupe. Although the Group B-spec S4 and T16 cars were mid-engined, they still originated as front-engined cars. Lancia's predecessor to the Delta S4 - the 037 - was also a mid-engined Group B supercar, but it was based on and had originated from Lancia's mid-engined Montecarlo production car.

Production

FIA homologation rules for Group B required the construction of at least 200 road-legal vehicles, and Ford contracted Reliant Motors PLC to construct these 200 units at their Shenstone facility, with spare parts for another 20+ units put aside for the racing teams. Those chassis and spare parts were later also used to build a couple of non-genuine, so-called bitsa cars.

A total of 24 of the 200 original cars were reportedly later converted to the so-called "Evolution" models, mostly marked by their owners as "E" or "E2" types. Ford's first intention was to mark the FIA-required 20 "Evo" cars as series numbers 201 to 220 but as this was actually not necessary according to the FIA rules they later kept their original series numbers (e.g. 201 = 012, 202 = 146, 203 = 174 et cetera).

The original bodywork tooling for the Ford RS200 was latterly bought by Banham Conversions, who used it to make a kit car version based on the Austin Maestro. Due to being a basic rebody of the Maestro, the Austin-Rover engine ancillaries are actually to be found at the front of the vehicle.

Specification (Group B rally car)

Engine
Longitudinally-mounted, mid-engine, four-wheel-drive layout
Head/block aluminium alloy/aluminium alloy
4 cylinders in line, Nikasil integrated liners
5 main bearings. Water cooled, electric fan
Bore: 
Stroke: 
Capacity: 
Valve gear: Dual overhead cams, 4 valves per cylinder, toothed belt camshaft drive
Compression ratio: 7.2:1. Bosch Motronic engine management system and fuel injection. Garrett T3 turbocharger/boost pressure .
Max. power:  at 8,000 rpm
Max. torque:  at 5,500 rpm

Transmission
5-speed manual, AP twin plate paddle clutch with cerrametallic linings

Final drive: Spiral bevel, ratio 4.375 to transfer ratio of 1.15

Suspension
Front, independent, double wishbones, twin coil springs and telescopic dampers, anti-roll bar
Rear, independent, double wishbones, twin coil springs and telescopic dampers, anti-roll bar, adjustable toe control link

Steering
Rack and pinion, a small quantity of cars also had hydraulic power assistance. Steering wheel diameter 14 in, 1.8 turns lock-to-lock,

Brakes
Dual circuits, split front/rear. Front  diameter ventilated discs. Rear  diameter ventilated discs, no vacuum servo. Handbrake, mechanical fly-off and hydraulic centre lever acting on separate, mechanically operated rear calipers.

Wheels
Ford magnesium alloy, 6–8 in rims (8¾ in and 11 in option for racing tyres). Tyre dependent on conditions (Pirelli Monte Carlo intermediates 245/40 16 on test car), 16 in diameter, pressures dependent on tyres used.

Dimensions and weights
Length: 
Width: 
Height: variable
Wheelbase: 
Track (Front/Rear): 59.1/58.9 in (1,502/1,497 mm)
Weight:

Performance 

Top speeds:

Acceleration from rest:

Standing 1/4-mile: 11.4 sec, 

Standing km: Not known

Acceleration (s):

References

 Heightened Perception - Autocar 12 November 1986 issue

External links

 Ford RS 200 Information

RS200
Rally cars
Sports cars
Group B cars
Rear mid-engine, all-wheel-drive vehicles
Cars introduced in 1984
Cars discontinued in 1986